KCR may refer to:

K. Chandrashekar Rao, the current Chief Minister of the Indian state of Telangana
Kansas City Royals, a Major League Baseball team
 Karachi Circular Railway, the proposed metro rail system of Karachi, Pakistan
 KCR, a landmark crossroads in Dublin, Ireland
 KCR CRO, Contract Research Organization
 KCR (SDSU), a student-run radio station at San Diego State University in San Diego, California, United States

See also
 Kowloon–Canton Railway (disambiguation)